Khotynets is the name of several inhabited localities in Khotynetsky District of Oryol Oblast, Russia.

Urban localities
Khotynets, Khotynetsky District, Oryol Oblast, an urban-type settlement

Rural localities
Khotynets, Abolmasovsky Selsoviet, Khotynetsky District, Oryol Oblast, a selo in Abolmasovsky Selsoviet